Mouloudia Club de Marrakech or simply MC Marrakech is a Moroccan football club based in Marrakech. It was established in 1948. The club plays in the GNFA 1, the equivalent of the third division.

References

Football clubs in Morocco
Association football clubs established in 1948
Sport in Marrakesh
1948 establishments in Morocco